Pacific Northwest windstorms, sometimes colloquially known as Big Blows,  are extratropical cyclones which form in the Pacific basin, and affect land areas in the Pacific Northwest of the United States and British Columbia, Canada. They form as cyclonic windstorms associated with areas of low atmospheric pressure that track across the North Pacific Ocean towards western North America. Deep low pressure areas are relatively common over the North Pacific. They are most common in the winter months. On average, the month when most windstorms form is November or December.

The closest analogue to these storms are European windstorms, which develop over the eastern portion of the North Atlantic Ocean as opposed to the North Pacific. Nor'easters, a similar class of extratropical cyclones, commonly affect the east coast of North America. While the storms on the East Coast are named "nor'easters", the Pacific Northwest windstorms are not called "nor'westers" because the cyclones' primary winds can blow from any direction, while the primary winds in nor'easters usually blow from the northeast.

Categories and frequency

Notable Pacific Northwest windstorms
 1880: Great Gale of 1880
 1921: January 29, the Great Olympic Blowdown.
 1962: Columbus Day Storm began life as tropical storm Typhoon Frieda/Freda. 
 1979: February 13 windstorm leads to the catastrophic failure of the Hood Canal Bridge. 
 1981: Friday the 13th Windstorms, November 13–15 
 1990: November 22–24, Mercer island bridge sinking Washington state 
 1993: Inauguration Day windstorm, January 20. Claimed five lives, 750,000 homes and businesses without power with total damage in western Washington of $130 million. 
 1995: December 11–12 
 2000: January 16, 2000
 2002: South Valley Surprise of 2002
 2006: The Hannukah Eve windstorm caused hundreds of millions of dollars in damage, left over 1.8 million residences and businesses without power, and killed eighteen. Most deaths were caused by carbon monoxide poisoning in the days following the storm because of improper use of barbecue cookers and generators indoors. 
 2007: Great Coastal Gale of 2007
 2012: November 19
 2013: Remnants of Typhoon Pabuk on September 28-29, 2013 caused heavy rain in Portland, Oregon had the wettest September ever on record. The moisture from the Pineapple Express coming from Hawaii.
 2014: December 11: Brought the strongest recorded wind gust to Portland since 1995, of 59 MPH
 2015: August 29–30 windstorm knocking out power to 710,000 customers in British Columbia's Lower Mainland region. Several municipalities in Metro Vancouver were without power for three days; at the time it was the largest outage in BC Hydro's recorded history.
 2015, December 21
 2016: March 9
 2016: Ides of October storm, Typhoon Sondga transitioned into an extratropical storm as it crossed the North Pacific and approached the west coast of North America. Originally, expected to be a historic windstorm to make a direct hit on Washington State, the worst of the storm ended up staying offshore. Despite this, coastal regions reported winds as high as 100 mph and an EF-2 tornado touched down in Manzanita.
 2018: December 20, as winds approached (and occasionally exceeded) 100 km/h, trees came down, high seas cancelled ferries and over 750,000 customers in British Columbia lost power; causing the largest outage in BC Hydro's recorded history.  One man needed to be rescued by helicopter from the damaged White Rock Pier and a woman was killed in Duncan after being struck by a tree.
 2021: October 2021 Northeast Pacific bomb cyclone Powerful storm system that underwent rapid bombogenesis with air pressure bottoming out at 942 hPa. Heavy rain and snow along with strong winds were reported.

See also

 Nor'easter – A similar class of powerful extratropical cyclones that affects the east coast of North America.

References

External links
Wolf Read: The Storm King- Some Historical Weather Events in the Pacific Northwest
KCTS9 Science Cafe: Great Windstorms of the Pacific Northwest with Dr. Cliff Mass

Extratropical cyclones
Natural disasters in Oregon
Natural disasters in Washington (state)
 
Weather events in the United States
Weather events in Canada